Christopher Gore Penny (born May 4, 1962 in Morristown, New Jersey) is an American former competitive rower and Olympic silver medalist.  He was a member of the American men's eights team that won the silver medal at the 1984 Summer Olympics in Los Angeles, California.

A 1984 graduate of Princeton University, Penny studied at St John's College, Oxford, and took part in The Boat Race in 1988 after being left off the squad in 1987 when he, three other American oarsmen, and an American coxswain protested Oxford coach Daniel Topolski's training regimen (an incident known as "The Oxford Boat Race Mutiny").

See also
 List of Princeton University Olympians
 True Blue: The Oxford Boat Race Mutiny

References

1962 births
Living people
American male rowers
Rowers at the 1984 Summer Olympics
Olympic silver medalists for the United States in rowing
Alumni of St John's College, Oxford
Oxford University Boat Club rowers
People from Morristown, New Jersey
Medalists at the 1984 Summer Olympics
Princeton University alumni
Pan American Games medalists in rowing
Pan American Games gold medalists for the United States
Rowers at the 1983 Pan American Games